The discography of Japanese rock band Spitz consists of 16 studio albums, 3 extended plays, 6 compilations, 44 physical singles, and 1 digital single. All chart positions are provided by the Japanese chart company Original Confidence, and music certifications are given by the Recording Industry Association of Japan.

Throughout their career, Spitz has sold in excess of 20.8 million copies albums and singles by the end of 2013, based on cumulative sales counted by the Oricon charts. Universal Music Group announced that the band had sold over 32 million units records as of August 2009.

Albums

Studio albums

Extended plays

Compilation albums

Singles
Physical releases

Digital releases

Videography

Video Clips

Live Video

References

Discographies of Japanese artists
Rock music group discographies